Thermotalea is a strictly anaerobic and thermophilic genus of bacteria from the family of Clostridiaceae with one known species (Thermotalea metallivorans). Thermotalea metallivorans has been isolated from microbial mats from the Great Artesian Basin.

References

Clostridiaceae
Bacteria genera
Monotypic bacteria genera
Taxa described in 2009